Rațiu is a Romanian-language surname that may refer to:

the Rațiu family
Augustin Rațiu (1884–1970)
Basiliu Rațiu (1783–1870)
Ioan Rațiu (1828–1902)
Ion Rațiu (1917–2000)
Mircea-Dimitrie Rațiu (1923–2011)
Nicolae Rațiu (1856–1932)
Tudor Ratiu (1950–)
Alexander Ratiu (1916–2002)

and to:

Rațiu, a village in Tășnad town, Satu Mare County, Romania

Romanian-language surnames